Afsar Khan (1950 – 7 February 2015), also known as Mohd Muqteda Khan, was the core member of AIMIM, who was elected to serve as MLA in the Andhra Pradesh Legislative Assembly for Karwan constituency between 2003 and 2014. He died on 7 February 2015 at the age of 65.

Afsar Khan and 20 AIMIM members attacked noted Bangladeshi novelist Taslima Nasreen as protest against blasphemy against Muhammed on 9-August-2007 during the launch of her new book in Hyderabad.

References

External links
http://www.siasat.com/news/former-mla-afsar-khan-passes-away-712084/
http://www.thehindu.com/todays-paper/tp-national/tp-andhrapradesh/article1813898.ece
http://timesofindia.indiatimes.com/city/hyderabad/MLA-named-in-one-too-many-cases/articleshow/3286346.cms
http://www.newindianexpress.com/cities/hyderabad/Afsar-Khan-Passes-Away/2015/02/07/article2656546.ece
http://www.gulte.com/news/35740/Controversial-MIM-Leader-Dead
http://timesofindia.indiatimes.com/india/Taslima-Nasreen-attacked-in-Hyderabad-during-book-launch/articleshow/2267996.cms

1950 births
2015 deaths
Andhra Pradesh MLAs 2009–2014